New Hope is a city in Madison County, Alabama, United States, and is included in the Huntsville-Decatur Combined Statistical Area. As of the 2020 census, the population was 2,889.

History
Originally named "Cloud's Town" in 1829 by its founder, William Cloud, it was incorporated in 1832 under the name of "Vienna". Lieutenant Colonel Alfred Reed of the 12th Indiana Cavalry seized the town on May 29, 1864, during the American Civil War. Vienna was burned by the Union Army on December 15, 1864, because of the constant skirmishes with the guerrilla fighters in the area. All that remained were the post office and Masonic Lodge. Since there was already a post office called Vienna in southern Alabama and rules were that there could not be two post offices with the same name at that time, the rebuilt city was incorporated in 1883 as "New Hope", taking its name from the New Hope Methodist Church. The settlement known as Cloud's Town was actually settled in what is now known as Cloud's Cove just off Hobbs Island Road and is a few miles from the town of New Hope.

Education
New Hope Elementary School (K-6)
New Hope High School (7–12)

Geography
New Hope is located in southeastern Madison County at  (34.538194, −86.412129), along U.S. Route 431.

Demographics

Note that New Hope did not appear on the 1890 and 1940-1950 U.S. Censuses. In the case of the latter two years, it is likely their incorporation charter lapsed and was not renewed until prior to its reappearance on the 1960 U.S. Census.

2000 census
As of the census of 2000, there were 2,539 people in 1,033 households, including 729 families, in the city. The racial makeup of the city was 94.80% White, 0.39% Black or African American, 1.81% Native American, 0.24% Asian, 0.67% from other races, and 2.09% from two or more races. 0.95% of the population were Hispanic or Latino of any race.

Of the 1,033 households 34.2% had children under the age of 18 living with them, 54.1% were married couples living together, 12.3% had a female householder with no husband present, and 29.4% were non-families. 26.8% of households were one person and 11.3% were one person aged 65 or older. The average household size was 2.46 and the average family size was 2.97.

The age distribution was 26.0% under the age of 18, 8.5% from 18 to 24, 30.8% from 25 to 44, 21.4% from 45 to 64, and 13.3% 65 or older. The median age was 36 years. For every 100 females, there were 90.5 males. For every 100 females age 18 and over, there were 89.5 males.

The median household income was $31,458 and the median family income  was $39,427. Males had a median income of $30,852 versus $20,263 for females. The per capita income for the city was $15,655. About 8.2% of families and 11.4% of the population were below the poverty line, including 14.4% of those under age 18 and 15.1% of those age 65 or over.

2010 census
As of the census of 2010, there were 2,810 people in 1,143 households, including 795 families, in the city. The racial makeup of the city was 93.7% White, 0.2% Black or African American, 2.5% Native American, 0.3% Asian, 0.7% from other races, and 2.5% from two or more races. 1.4% of the population were Hispanic or Latino of any race.

Of the 1,143 households 30.0% had children under the age of 18 living with them, 51.8% were married couples living together, 12.5% had a female householder with no husband present, and 30.4% were non-families. 25.5% of households were one person and 11.0% were one person aged 65 or older. The average household size was 2.46 and the average family size was 2.93.

The age distribution was 23.5% under the age of 18, 8.5% from 18 to 24, 27.6% from 25 to 44, 27.7% from 45 to 64, and 12.7% 65 or older. The median age was 38.2 years. For every 100 females, there were 96.5 males. For every 100 females age 18 and over, there were 95.7 males.

The median household income was $38,423 and the median family income  was $47,396. Males had a median income of $33,135 versus $24,167 for females. The per capita income for the city was $19,104. About 5.7% of families and 11.5% of the population were below the poverty line, including 15.3% of those under age 18 and 9.8% of those age 65 or over.

2020 census

As of the 2020 United States census, there were 2,889 people, 1,087 households, and 834 families residing in the city.

Education
The local school district is Madison County Schools.

Notable people
Ernest Hinds, US Army major general
Jim Tabor, professional baseball player
Nancy Worley, 50th Secretary of State of Alabama

References

Cities in Alabama
Cities in Madison County, Alabama
Huntsville-Decatur, AL Combined Statistical Area
Populated places established in 1883
1883 establishments in Alabama